The Battle of Minisink was a battle of the American Revolutionary War fought at Minisink Ford, New York, on July 22, 1779. It was the only major skirmish of the Revolutionary War fought in the northern Delaware Valley. The battle was a decisive British victory, as the colonial militia was hastily assembled, ill-equipped, and inexperienced.

Brant's raid
Although British forces were largely concentrated on Manhattan Island, Joseph Brant, a Mohawk war chief and a captain in the British Army, was sent along with his Brant's Volunteers on a quest for provisions, to gather intelligence on the Delaware in the vicinity of Minisink, and to disrupt the upcoming American Sullivan Campaign.

In June 1777, he received word that Kazimierz Pulaski's forces had moved into Pennsylvania, leaving much of the Minisink Valley undefended. Brant led his force of Loyalists and Iroquois raiders through the valley, with the goal of seizing supplies and demoralizing the colonists. With Brant's force of 60 tribesmen and 27 Tories disguised as Indians in pursuit, the settlers were forced to flee to more populated areas. On July 20, he reached Peenpack, which he attacked immediately. Brant ordered that "they should not kill any women or children" or Loyalists and to take prisoner any who surrendered. His raid was a crushing success and, leaving Fort Decker and the settlement in ruins, Brant and his force continued north along the Delaware River.

Battle of Minisink
Later that day, riders from Peenpack reached the village of Goshen, telling of Brant's raid and the destruction of the town. A militia formed immediately, under the reluctant command of Lieutenant Colonel Benjamin Tusten. Tusten was strongly opposed to pursuing the raiders, as he knew they would be no match for the British and Iroquois soldiers, and he suggested waiting for reinforcements from the Continental Army. However, the majority of the public and the militia underestimated the fighting ability of the Iroquois and demanded immediate retribution. Outvoted, Tusten agreed to set out the following morning. They met up with elements of the Fourth Orange County Regiment ordered from Warwick by George Washington and led by Colonel John Hathorn. Colonel Hathorn assumed command and marched for the Delaware with a force of about 120 minutemen.

On the morning of July 22, the militia moved into position in the hills above the Delaware River, intending to ambush Brant's forces who were crossing at Minisink Ford. Hathorn split them into a group of skirmishers and two units comprising the main force. Before the ambush was set, however, Captain Bezaleel Tyler III of the militia, an experienced Indian fighter, fired at an Indian scout in Brant's party. This alerted Brant to the trap, and he quickly outflanked the two groups of colonials, many of whom fled. Separated from the main unit and with his forces scattered, Hathorn was unable to regroup his men for a counterattack. Some of his men were forced to retreat, leaving the rest of the militia surrounded and outnumbered. After several hours of continuous volleys, insufficient ammunition and close quarters caused the battle to devolve into hand-to-hand combat, at which the Iroquois excelled. At least 48 militiamen were killed, including Tusten himself. Brant's men gave no quarter to the wounded and captured, killing and scalping over 40 of them. One prisoner, Captain John Wood, was spared because Brant mistakenly believed him to be a fellow Mason. Brant's force, on the other hand, is believed to have lost only about seven men. Brant wrote of his casualties that three were killed and of the 10 wounded, 4 were dangerously wounded and possibly could not survive. Although badly wounded, Hathorn survived, returning to Warwick to write his report of the loss to his superiors.

Aftermath

After the battle, Brant and his men forded the Delaware and continued back to the ruins of Oquaga. The raid failed to disrupt the Sullivan Campaign and three weeks later, the Continental Army sent 3,000 troops into upstate New York, destroying every Iroquois village in their path. Brant finally met his defeat in late August at the Battle of Newtown.

The people of the Precinct of Goshen (which preceded the forming of the Towns of Orange County) were unable to bury their dead for 43 years, as the battlefield was too distant and way too dangerous. Some of the soldiers' widows attempted the trip but were forced to turn back. In 1822, a committee was formed to travel to the battlefield and comb the area for remains. The few bones recovered were buried in a mass grave, first in Barryville and later moved to the village of Goshen. A stone obelisk was erected for the centennial of the battle, engraved with the names of the dead.

In 1847, a burial was discovered in Lackawaxen, Pennsylvania that is believed to be the remains of a casualty of the Battle of Minisink. The site now serves as a memorial tomb for unknown Revolutionary War soldiers.

Today, the site is Minisink Battleground County Park in Sullivan County a couple of miles north of the Hamlet of Barryville near the Roebling Bridge. There are no man-made structures contemporary to the battle, but the park contains several trails, monuments, picnic areas, and a visitors' center.

References

https://www.recordonline.com/article/20030718/NEWS/307189985 Colonials took bloody beating at Battle of Minisink

Further reading
 Graymont, Barbara, The Iroquois in the American Revolution, 1972, 
 Kelsay, Isabel, Joseph Brant 1743-1807 Man of Two Worlds, 1984, 
 Hendrickson, Mark; Inners, Jon; Osborne, Peter, So Many Brave Men: A History of The Battle at Minisink Ford, 2010,

External links
Minisink battle map
Hathhorn and Brandt accounts of the Battle
accounts of Battle

1779 in the United States
Conflicts in 1779
1822 in the United States
Mohawk tribe
Minisink
Minisink
Minisink
Sullivan County, New York
Minisink
1779 in New York (state)